Improv Comedy Mumbai is an Indian improv comedy troupe. The group was founded by Adam Dow who was originally a member of Unexpected Productions in Seattle. It was one of the first improv troupes in the country. Improv Comedy Mumbai has been part of the International TheatreSports League  since 2014.

External links

References 

Indian comedy